"Brides of Frankenstein" is a medley of excerpts from various Orchestral Manoeuvres in the Dark (OMD) songs mixed with dance rhythms by Mike "Hitman" Wilson and Steve "Silk" Hurley.

It was released as a 12-inch single in 1988 in the United States and Canada. In 1991, both tracks were released as B-sides of the "Call My Name" CD single.

Track listing
All songs written by OMD.

12" single: A&M SP-12285 (US) / Virgin VSX 1461 (Canada)

A-side
 "Brides of Frankenstein" (Mix) – 7:14

B-side
 "Brides of Frankenstein" (Dub) – 6:18

Songs used in the mix
 "Locomotion"
 "Messages"
 "Secret"
 "So in Love"
 "If You Leave"
 "We Love You"

Charts

References

1988 singles
Orchestral Manoeuvres in the Dark songs
1988 songs
Virgin Records singles
A&M Records singles